Porus or Poros was a deme of ancient Attica, originally of the phyle of Acamantis but after 307/6 BCE, of the phyle of Demetrias, sending three delegates to the Athenian Boule. 

Its site is tentatively located near modern Metropisi.

References

Populated places in ancient Attica
Former populated places in Greece
Demoi